Hannum is a surname. Notable people with the surname include:

Alberta Pierson Hannum (1906–1985), American author
John Hannum (disambiguation), multiple people
Thom Hannum (born 1957), percussionist and music educator
Alex Hannum (1923–2002), American professional basketball player and coach